Sega Superstars Tennis is a mascot sports video game developed by Sumo Digital and published by Sega. It is the second title in the Sega All-Stars series, preceded by Sega Superstars (2005), and crosses over characters, locations, and soundtracks from several Sega franchises, including Sonic the Hedgehog, Space Channel 5, and Super Monkey Ball. 

The game was originally released for PlayStation 2, Xbox 360, PlayStation 3, and Wii, followed by releases for Mac OS X and multiple mobile versions. Upon release, the game received mixed reviews from critics, with reviewers praising the game's Sega-theming and variety of content but criticizing the core gameplay.

The game was followed up by two racing game entries, Sonic & Sega All-Stars Racing (2010) and Sonic & All-Stars Racing Transformed (2012).

Gameplay

The gameplay in Sega Superstars Tennis is similar to Sega's Virtua Tennis series, with characters able to perform techniques such as lob shots and drop shots. Characters each have different statisticts and proficiency in specific areas, such as power or control. Each character also has their own unique "Superstar State", a special ability that can be activated once an accompanying meter is filled. The effects of a Superstar State vary depending on the character; for example, Sonic transforms to Super Sonic and causes the ball to zig-zag when hit, while Gilius summons thunderbolts that can temporarily stun opponents. The game features 10 courts themed after various Sega games, such as Green Hill Zone from Sonic the Hedgehog and Shibuya Downtown from Jet Set Radio.

Sega Superstars Tennis features several gameplay modes. Superstars mode allows the player to complete various missions themed around a specific Sega games, which take the form of exhibition matches, tournaments and minigame score challenges; completing these missions will unlock new areas based on other games with additional sets of missions to complete. Players will unlock new additional characters, courts, and music for use in gameplay as they progress through Superstars. Match mode offers standard tennis gameplay in singles or doubles matches for up to four players locally, while Tournament mode allows a single player to compete in a series of five sequential matches against random computer opponents. There are also several playable minigames that feature alternate gameplay styles inspired by other Sega games, including Space Harrier, Puyo Pop Fever, ChuChu Rocket!, and Virtua Cop. The PlayStation 3 and Xbox 360 versions also support online multiplayer.

The Wii version features support for three different control schemes: the Wii Remote with Nunchuk, the Wii Remote sideways, and the Classic Controller. The Nintendo DS version of the game can be played with the standard control pad or the touch screen.

Playable characters 
Sega Superstars Tennis features 16 playable characters originating from eight different Sega franchises. Eight characters are available from the start, while the remaining eight must be unlocked through Superstars mode. The game marks the first 3D appearances of both Alex Kidd (Alex Kidd) and Gilius Thunderhead (Golden Axe) in a video game, and marks Alex Kidd's first playable appearance in eighteen years following the 1990 release of Alex Kidd in Shinobi World.

Reception

Sega Superstars Tennis received "mixed or average reviews" on all platforms according to the review aggregation website Metacritic.

Though it was praised for its multiplayer and enjoyable gameplay, the lack of graphical detail and online support was criticized. Eurogamer praised the Xbox 360 version for its fan service. Official Nintendo Magazine reviewed the Wii version, saying that it had great gameplay and fun minigames and was enjoyable in multiplayer. However, the game just missed out on a Gold Award (which is given to games that score 90% or higher in their reviews) due to the lack to Nintendo Wi-Fi support and blasted Sega for the omission due to Wi-Fi being supported on the Xbox and PS3, commenting that as Nintendo Wi-Fi had already proven its capabilities with other games, it appeared that Sega simply couldn't be bothered to include it. IGN called the Wii version "a tennis game that should have been better than it is." They criticized the lack of detail in the graphics, the muffled sound effects, simplistic gameplay, and the lack of an online mode, which is present in the PlayStation 3 and Xbox 360 versions.

See also
Virtua Tennis
List of games featuring Sonic the Hedgehog

References

External links

2008 video games
Xbox 360 games
PlayStation 3 games
Wii games
PlayStation 2 games
Nintendo DS games
MacOS games
Sega video games
Crossover video games
Sonic the Hedgehog video games
Tennis video games
Feral Interactive games
Sumo Digital games
Video games scored by Richard Jacques
Video games developed in the United Kingdom